Big room can refer to:
 Great room, a large room in a modern Western house
 Great hall, the largest room in a medieval manor
 Obeya, also known as "big room"; the equivalent of a "war room" in Japanese business
 Big room house, a subgenre of electro house dance music